Edward Daly (1891–1916) was commandant of Dublin's 1st battalion during the Easter Rising of 1916. He was the youngest man to hold that rank, and the youngest executed in the aftermath.

Background
Born as John Edward Daly at 26 Frederick Street (now O'Curry street), Limerick, on 25 February 1891, Daly was the only son among the ten children born to Edward and Catherine Daly (née O'Mara). He was the younger brother of Kathleen Clarke, wife of Tom Clarke, and an active member of the Irish Republican Brotherhood (IRB). His father, Edward, was a Fenian (IRB member) who died five months before his son's birth at the age of forty-one. His uncle was John Daly, a prominent republican who had taken part in the Fenian Rising and Fenian Dynamite Campaign. It was through John Daly that Clarke had met his future wife.

He was educated by the Presentation Sisters at Sexton Street, the Congregation of Christian Brothers at Roxboro Road and at Leamy’s commercial college. He spent a short time as an apprentice baker in Glasgow, before returning to Limerick to work in Spaight's timber yard. He later moved to Dublin where he eventually took up a position with a wholesale chemists. In 1913 he moved to Dublin where he lived with Kathleen and Tom Clarke.

Political involvement
Although Daly's membership of the IRB is certain, it is not known when he joined the organisation. In November 1913 Daly joined the newly founded Irish Volunteers. He soon reached the rank of captain. He was assiduous in his study of military manuals and the professionalism of his company gained the admiration of senior officers in actions such as the Howth gun-running of 1914. In March 1915, he was promoted to the rank of commandant of the 1st Battalion. Like many other of the rising's leaders Daly was a member of the Keating branch of the Gaelic League.

The Easter Rising
Daly's battalion, stationed in the Four Courts and areas to the west and north of the centre of Dublin, saw the most harsh fighting of the rising. He was forced to surrender his battalion on 29 April by Patrick Pearse. He was court martialed under the Defence of the Realm Act 1914 and executed by firing squad on 4 May 1916, at the age of 25.

The men in his battalion spoke of him as a good leader. This opinion was also shared by a British officer that Daly's battalion had captured.

Bray railway station was renamed Bray Daly railway station in his honour in 1966.

References

 Litton, Helen, Edward Daly, Dublin: O'Brien Press, 2013

External links 
 

1891 births
1916 deaths
Irish revolutionaries
Executed participants in the Easter Rising
Executed Irish people
Military personnel from Limerick (city)
Members of the Irish Republican Brotherhood